The Apostolic Nunciature to Samoa is an ecclesiastical office of the Catholic Church in Samoa. It is a diplomatic post of the Holy See, whose representative is called the Apostolic Nuncio with the rank of an ambassador. The nuncio resides in Wellington, New Zealand.

The Holy See and Samoa established diplomatic relations on 10 June 1994. Before then, the Holy See was represented in Samoa by a series of delegations whose responsibilities for areas of the Pacific narrowed as the Holy See established diplomatic relations with countries in the region.

List of papal representatives to Samoa 
Apostolic Nuncios
Thomas Anthony White (1994 – (27 April 1996)
Apostolic Delegate to the Pacific Ocean from 14 October 1989 
Patrick Coveney (27 April 1996 – 25 January 2005)
Charles Daniel Balvo (1 April 2006 – 17 January 2013)
Martin Krebs (23 September 2013 – 16 June 2018)
Novatus Rugambwa (17 April 2020 – present)

Notes

References

Samoa